Mabel Alice "Cissie" Caudeiron (20 December 1909 – 1968) was a folklorist from Roseau, Dominica.  Caudeiron became famous as a Creole nationalist, and is credited with leading or inspiring a roots revival in Dominican music.  She founded the Kairi Artistic Troop, and helped to organize the first National Day celebrations of 1965.

References

Dominica musicians
Folklorists
1909 births
1968 deaths
Dominica women writers
Women folklorists